New York's 59th State Senate district is one of 63 districts in the New York State Senate. It has been represented by Republican Patrick Gallivan since 2011.

Geography
District 59 stretches from the eastern suburbs of Buffalo to the southwestern suburbs of Rochester, including all of Wyoming County and parts of Erie, Livingston, and Monroe Counties.

The district overlaps with New York's 23rd, 24th, 25th, and 26th congressional districts, and with the 133rd, 138th, 142nd, 143rd, 144th, and 147th districts of the New York State Assembly.

Recent election results

2020

2018

2016

2014

2012

Federal results in District 59

References

59